Jagannathpur refers to:
Jagannathpur Upazila, an upazila in Sunamganj District, Sylhet Division, Bangladesh
Jagannathpur, Bankura, a village in Bankura district, West Bengal, India
Jagannathpur, Malda, a census town in Malda district, West Bengal, India
Jagannathpur-Parulia, a village in East Singhbhum district, Jharkhand, India
Jagannathapur railway station, a railway station in Ganjam district, Odisha, India